Joseph Vliers (18 December 1932 in Tongeren – 19 January 1994 in Tongeren), (mostly called Jef Vliers), was a Belgian football player who finished top scorer of the Belgian First Division with 25 goals and in 1958 while playing for Beerschot.  He formerly played with Patria Tongeren and then with Racing de Bruxelles.  In the summer of 1955, he moved to Beerschot and he eventually played with Standard Liège.  Vliers played six times with the Belgium national team between 1955 and 1963.  He made his international debut on 3 April 1955 in a 1–0 friendly defeat to the Netherlands.  He was in the team for the 1954 FIFA World Cup but he did not play.

References

External links

Profile at Standard de Liège

1932 births
1994 deaths
Belgian footballers
Belgium international footballers
Belgian expatriates in Germany
Expatriate footballers in Germany
K. Beerschot V.A.C. players
Standard Liège players
1954 FIFA World Cup players
Belgian Pro League players
Belgian football managers
Royal Antwerp F.C. managers
Standard Liège managers
Luxembourg national football team managers
K. Beringen F.C. managers
K.F.C. Rhodienne-De Hoek players
Association football forwards
K.S.K. Tongeren players
People from Tongeren
Footballers from Limburg (Belgium)